Gergitha or Gergetha, also known as Gergina and Gergithus, Gergithium or Gergithion, was a town in ancient Lydia, near Stratonicea, at the sources of the Caicus River, said to have been peopled by the inhabitants of Gergis in the Troad by King Attalus of Pergamus.

Cephalon of Gergitha, was an ancient writer.

Its site is tentatively located near Yirca, Asiatic Turkey.

References

Populated places in ancient Lydia
Former populated places in Turkey